St. Francis De'Sales High School (SFS School) and Junior College Nagpur is an educational institution in Nagpur, Maharashtra, India. Established in 1870, the school is managed by the Missionaries of St. Francis de Sales(MSFS). SFS School is governed by the Nagpur Archdiocese. It is in Sadar, Nagpur.

St. Francis De'Sales High school is headed by Rev. Fr. Prashant (Principal), Sister Gladys (Vice principal) and Sir Anil Louis (supervisor). Traditionally an all-boys school, became a co-educational school in 2008. The school is affiliated to the Maharashtra State Board of Secondary and Higher Secondary Education, Pune, Maharashtra.

SFS School has three houses — Pelvat (red), Dufresne (green) and Coppel (blue) — named after past principals. The students are divided into the houses to encourage competition among them, literary,sports,and other fields.

History
SFS High School was established in 1867 at Kamptee and moved to its present location at Sadar, Nagpur in 1870. The school celebrated 125 years of existence in 1995; 140 years in 2010. It is about to celebrate 150 years in the year 2020.

Notable alumni

 Col. C. K. Nayudu, cricket legend
 Archbishop Eugene D'Souza 
 Dr. Jamshed Jiji Irani, ex-MD: Tata Steel
 Jimmy Mehta, ex-tennis champion
 Rajkumar Hirani, Bollywood writer and leading director of Munnabhai, 3 Idiots, PK fame.
 Pearce Brothers, introduced hockey to Australians
 Air Vice Marshal Gordon D'Souza
 Vice Admiral R.F., Contractor, head of Coast Guard of India 
 Major-General S. Tewari
 Lt Gen. M.S. Sodhi former head of Core of Signals
 Lt Gen Christopher (Bobby) Baretto
 Tarun Bose, Indian actor
 Bishop Sylvester Monteiro
 Adv. Harish Salve, former Solicitor General of India
 Dr. Shrikant Jichkar, MBBS, MD, IPS, IAS, writer, educationist, politician, former Home Minister GoM
 Dr. Prasad Dhurjati, a scientist in Genetic Engineering, University of Delaware, USA
 Dr.Yunus Langha, pediatric dentist, Texas Children's Hospital, TX, USA; entrepreneur, philanthropist, educationist.
 Akash Khurana, stage and Bollywood actor, director
 Brig. Dilip R Naidu, Vishisht Seva Medal, ex-Director Army Institute of Technology, Pune
 Sharad Arvind Bobde, 47th Chief Justice of Supreme Court of India
 Justice Pratap Hardas, Bombay High Court
 Shri Mukul Wasnik, Congress General Secretary and former Union Minister for many years
 Dr. Anees Ahmed, Congress Secretary and former Maharashtra Minister for many years 
 Vikas Gupta, Indian actor
 Khusro Faramurz Rustomji, IP (KF Rustomji), founder/father of the Border Security Force, Director General
 Rear Admiral Joy Chatterjee (Indian Navy), VSM, Addl D.G., Medical Services, Integrated Services Command
 Major General Chandan Chatterjee, Engineers, Bombay Engineering Group
 Dr Anjan Kr Chatterjee, Additional Director General, Geological Survey of India
 Dr Peshotan S (Pesho) Kotval, MD, PhD, MBA, FASM, FAIUM, DABR, Materials Scientist and Diagnostic Radiologist

Motto
Sapere Aude which means "Dare to be Wise".

Anthem
"Dare to be Wise"
Dare to be wise! Dare to be wise! 
Within your reach, all knowledge lies 
Count not the cost, nor fear the pain, 
if great success you wish to gain.

Chorus: Come comrades come! Dare to be wise! 
Let us all ever prize 
This great aim of our lives 
In-home and school, in work and play
We'll let it shine and guide our way.

Dare to be wise! Dare to be wise! 
This rule in life will make you rise, 
Hold fast it through storm and strife 
Thus you will gain the crown of life.

Dare to be wise! Dare to be wise! 
To him who strives there comes the prize 
But strive must with the brain as well 
if high we wish to reign and dwell.

Dare to be wise! Dare to be wise! 
It is the road to paradise.
Avoid the wrong in life be strong 
And life's reward will come long.

References

Official website
 Official website
 The SFS College Nagpur, Official website

Catholic secondary schools in India
Christian schools in Maharashtra
High schools and secondary schools in Maharashtra
Schools in Nagpur
Educational institutions established in 1867
1867 establishments in India